Wagner José Alberto Carvalho Domingos (born 26 March 1983 in Recife) is a Brazilian athlete specializing in the hammer throw. His personal best of 78.63 metres (2016) is the current South American record.

In the first half of 2016, Domingos broke 3 times the Brazilian record of Hammer Throw: launched the hammer to 75,60m in May in Zagreb; 75,62m in Varazdin, and 76,12m in Zagreb again. The first time he broke the Brazilian record in 2005, the best mark in the country was 66,30m. Until then, the record was not improved since 1978.

On June 20, 2016, he finally broke the South American record for the hammer throw with 78,63m. The South American record was 76.42m, belonged to the Argentine Juan Cerra until 2006. Brazil again had a representative at the Olympic Games in this event, which has not happened since Carmine Di Giorgi played it in Los Angeles 1932.

In December 2012, he married javelin thrower Laila Ferrer e Silva.

Personal best
 Hammer throw: 78.63  m –  Celje, 19 June 2016

Competition record

References

External links
 

1983 births
Living people
Brazilian male hammer throwers
Sportspeople from Recife
Athletes (track and field) at the 2007 Pan American Games
Athletes (track and field) at the 2011 Pan American Games
Athletes (track and field) at the 2015 Pan American Games
World Athletics Championships athletes for Brazil
Athletes (track and field) at the 2016 Summer Olympics
Olympic athletes of Brazil
South American Games gold medalists for Brazil
South American Games bronze medalists for Brazil
South American Games medalists in athletics
Competitors at the 2014 South American Games
Athletes (track and field) at the 2018 South American Games
Pan American Games athletes for Brazil
20th-century Brazilian people
21st-century Brazilian people